Adam Kelwick  is a British Muslim chaplain and humanitarian aid worker. He is best known for his work representing the British Muslim community and on the humanitarian situation in Yemen.
  
He has conducted humanitarian aid work in Yemen, Lebanon, Syria, Calais and Somalia.

References 

Year of birth missing (living people)
Living people